Luiz Bonfá Composer of Black Orpheus Plays and Sings Bossa Nova is a 1962 album by Luiz Bonfá arranged by Lalo Schifrin.

Track listing
 "Samba De Duas Notas (Two Note Samba)" – 2:45
 "Vem Só (Come Here, My Love)" – 1:57
 "Sambalamento" – 2:17
 "Tristeza (Brazilian Blues)" – 3:02
 "Manhã De Carnaval (Morning of the Carnival)" – 3:18
 "Silêncio Do Amor (The Silence of Love)" – 2:07
 "Domingo a Noite (Sunday Night)" – 2:00
 "Ilha De Coral (Coral Island)" – 3:21
 "Adeus (Goodbye)" – 3:22
 "Quebra Mar (The Sea Wall)" – 2:27
 "Amor Que Acabou (The End of Love)" – 2:04
 "Chora Tua Tristeza (Cry Your Blues Away)" – 3:04
 "Bossa Nova Cha Cha" – 3:20

Personnel
Luiz Bonfá – guitar, vocals
Maria Helena Toledo – vocals
Leo Wright – flute
Oscar Castro-Neves – piano, electric organ, guitar
Iko Castro-Neves – double bass
Roberto Pontes-Dias – drums, percussion
Lalo Schifrin – arranger
Technical
Jim Marshall – photography

References

External links
 

1963 albums
Albums arranged by Lalo Schifrin
Luiz Bonfá albums
Portuguese-language albums
Verve Records albums